The Mozambican Cricket Association sent teams to Eswatini in July 2022 to play six men's Twenty20 International (T20I) and six Women's Twenty20 International (WT20I) matches. These were the first official T20I and WT20I matches to be played in Eswatini. The men's series was played at Malkerns Country Club Oval in Malkerns, with Mozambique winning 6–0 against a new-look Eswatini side. The women's series was played at Enjabulweni Cricket Ground in Manzini and was also won 6–0 by the tourists.

Men's series

Squads

1st T20I

2nd T20I

3rd T20I

4th T20I

5th T20I

6th T20I

Women's series

Squads

1st WT20I

2nd WT20I

3rd WT20I

4th WT20I

5th WT20I

6th WT20I

Notes

References

External links
 Series home at ESPNcricinfo (men's)
 Series home at ESPNcricinfo (women's)

Associate international cricket competitions in 2022